The National Digital Information Infrastructure and Preservation Program (NDIIPP) of the United States was an archival program led by the Library of Congress to archive and provide access to digital resources. The program convened several working groups, administered grant projects, and disseminated information about digital preservation issues. The U.S. Congress established the program in 2000, and official activity specific to NDIIPP itself wound down between 2016 and 2018. The Library was chosen because of its role as one of the leading providers of high-quality content on the Internet. The Library of Congress has formed a national network of partners dedicated to preserving specific types of digital content that is at risk of loss.

In July 2010, the Library launched a National Digital Stewardship Alliance (NDSA) to extend the work of NDIIPP to more institutions. The organization, which has been hosted by the Digital Library Federation since January 2016, focuses on several goals. It develops improved preservation standards and practices, works with experts to identify categories of digital information that are most worthy of preservation, and takes steps to incorporate content into a national collection. It provides national leadership for digital preservation education and training. NDSA also provides communication and outreach for all aspects of digital preservation. The NDSA membership includes universities, professional associations, commercial businesses, consortia, and government agencies.

Overview
The preservation of digital content has become a major challenge for libraries and archives whose mission is to preserve the intellectual and cultural heritage of the nation. In 1998, the Library of Congress began to develop a digital strategy with a group of senior managers who were charged with assessing the roles and responsibilities of the Library in the digital age. This oversight group was headed by the Associate Librarian for Strategic Initiatives, the Associate Librarian for Library Services, and the Register of Copyrights. This group held several planning meetings to assess the current state of digital archiving and preservation.

The Librarian of Congress James H. Billington commissioned the National Research Council Computer Science and Telecommunications Board of the National Academy of Sciences to evaluate the Library's readiness to meet the challenges of the rapidly evolving digital world. They recommended that the Library, working with other federal and non-federal institutions, take the lead in a national, cooperative effort to archive and preserve digital information.

In December 2000, Congress appropriated up to $100 million ($75 million of which was slated for dollar for dollar cost matching) for the effort. Congress rescinded $47 million in unspent funds in 2007. In 2009, NDIIPP received about $6.5 million as a line item in the Library's annual budget appropriation.

Congressional legislation
The U.S. Congress has asked the Library of Congress to lead a collaborative project, called the National Digital Information Infrastructure and Preservation Program. In December 2000, Congress passed special legislation (Public Law 106-554) in recognition of the importance of preserving digital content for future generations, appropriating $100 million to the Library of Congress to lead this effort. (A government-wide rescission of .22 percent in late December 2000 reduced this special appropriation to $99.8 million.)

This effort falls within the Library Services mission, which includes providing access to and preserving information for the benefit of the United States and the World. This mission extends to materials in electronic formats as well. In addition, the Library is the home of the U.S. Copyright Office and is thus already engaged in issues relating to copyright in a digital environment.

Participating organizations
The National Digital Information Infrastructure and Preservation Program is a cooperative effort.

The Library works closely with partners to assess considerations for shared responsibilities. Federal legislation calls for the Library to work jointly with the Secretary of Commerce, the director of the White House Office of Science and Technology Policy, and the National Archives and Records Administration. The legislation also directs the Library to seek the participation of "other federal, research and private libraries and institutions with expertise in the collection and maintenance of archives of digital materials," including the National Library of Medicine, the National Agricultural Library, the Research Libraries Group, the Online Computer Library Center, and the Council on Library and Information Resources.

The Library also works with the non-federal sector. The overall strategy is being executed in cooperation with the library, creative, publishing, technology, and copyright communities. In early 2001, the Library established a National Digital Strategy Advisory Board to help guide it through the planning process. This board is made up of experts from the technology, publishing, Internet, library, and intellectual-property communities, as well as government.

The Library has also established a working group to look at ways that current copyright law can address how libraries and archives handle digital materials when preserving them and making them available to users.

National significance
The availability of electronic information is today taken for granted. With the rapid growth of the Internet and the World Wide Web, millions of people have grown accustomed to using these tools as resources to acquire information—from a Ph.D. candidate conducting research for a dissertation to a teacher who might not be able to take a class on a field trip to see historical artifacts to a lifelong learner.

Digital has become the principal medium to create, distribute, and store content, from text to motion pictures to recorded sound. Digital content now embodies much of the nation's intellectual, social, and cultural history. Because digital materials can be so easily altered, corrupted, or lost, these materials must be saved now if they are to remain available to today's and tomorrow's generations.

NDIIPP provided a national focus on important policy, standards, and technical components necessary to preserve digital content. Investments in modeling and testing various options and technical solutions took place over several years, resulting in recommendations to the U.S. Congress about the most viable and sustainable options for long-term preservation, copyright law in the context of digital preservation, and other issues.

In 2008, NDIIPP was the United States author for a four-nation recommendation (United States, Australia, United Kingdom, and the Netherlands) to establish laws to support digital preservation, particularly for materials at risk of being lost. That report summarized the state of digital preservation in each country at the time and highlighted relevant existing law for each country.

NDIIPP kickstarted the Library's efforts to advice individuals on personal digital archiving. This resulted in an e-book on the topic and the seeds of the current Library of Congress website on Personal Digital Archiving.

NDIIPP managed the Congressional appropriation to kick-start many important digital preservation endeavors, some in the Digital preservation partnership projects section. Two others of note were issues that had some prior development but were realized fully with the assistance of NDIIPP funding. The first technology was LOCKSS, a tool for digital preservation of scholarly articles and other digital formats. The second was a pilot project for archiving digital content from the WNET Public Broadcasting station, the Preserving Digital Public Television Project. That project evolved into today's American Archive of Public Broadcasting.

Digital preservation partnership projects

Included in the 300 partners (as of March 2013) are eight consortial partnerships comprising 33 institutions that are selecting, collecting, and preserving specific types of digital content:
 Data-PASS
 Dot Com Archive
ECHO DEPository
 International Internet Preservation Consortium
 MetaArchive Cooperative
 National Geospatial Digital Archive
 North Carolina Geospatial Data Archiving Project
 Web at Risk

Collections 

In keeping with the mission of the NDIIPP, they are working with over 1,400 collections globally to preserve institution's at-risk digital content. The collection's content ranges from Arts and Culture, Religion and Philosophy, Social Sciences, and World History and Cultures. The Library of Congress provides a full list of the collections as well as a interactive map of the collections' geographical location.

References

External links
 Library of Congress, National Digital Library Program
 The Library of Congress, Web Archiving
 National Digital Information Infrastructure and Preservation Program
NDIIPP on iTunes U
NDIIPP on Youtube
NDSA: National Digital Stewardship Alliance, now hosted by the Council on Library and Information Resources

Archival science
Digital Library project
Digital preservation
Web archiving initiatives
American digital libraries
Conservation and restoration organizations